Pack Up Your Troubles may refer to:
Pack Up Your Troubles (1932 film), a 1932 Laurel and Hardy film
Pack Up Your Troubles (1939 film), a 1939 American comedy film
Pack Up Your Troubles (1940 film), a 1940 British war comedy film

See also
"Pack Up Your Troubles in Your Old Kit-Bag", a World War I marching song